A New Wave is a 2006 independently produced comedy film written and directed by Jason Carvey.

Plot
A would-be artist is working in a dead-end job as a bank teller. At the urging of his movie-obsessed slacker roommate, he agrees to be the inside man for a bank heist. While the heist plans are coordinated, the artist's girlfriend arranges for him to have his first gallery exhibition. But when he tries to stop the heist, the plan is too far into motion to be halted.

Cast

Setting
The film was shot in various locations throughout Connecticut.

Reception
Reviews for the film were mixed, with Film Threat cheering it as "a deceptive sleeper" while FilmCritic.com complained that it was "a post-modern pastiche of heist flick and comedy, the kind popularized by Reservoir Dogs and knocked off endlessly ever since it was released."

Release
The film was a direct-to-DVD release, distributed by ThinkFilm.

References

External links
 
 
 
 Interview with director Jason Carvey on Film Threat

2006 comedy films
2006 films
2000s English-language films